"Unlove You" is the second single by Canadian singer Elise Estrada from her self-titled debut album.

Charts
"Unlove You" debuted at #94 on the Canadian Hot 100 on the issue of December 22 based on airplay, and since then it slowly rose up to the top fifty, but continuously dropped in position every week. After the song was released on iTunes for digital download, it moved from #41 to #11 on the issue of April 5, making it Estrada's first top twenty hit on the chart. The single is also her most successful one to date.

Weekly charts

Year-end charts

References

External links
 Official website
 MySpace page

2008 singles
2008 songs
Songs written by Dane Deviller
Songs written by Sean Hosein